"With Every Heartbeat" is a song by Swedish record producer Kleerup and Swedish singer-songwriter Robyn. It was first released on 10 January 2007 in Sweden and later on 30 July 2007 in the United Kingdom. It was released as the second single from the international edition of Robyn's self-titled fourth studio album and the lead single from Kleerup's self-titled debut studio album.

The song peaked at number one in the United Kingdom and reached the top ten in Belgium, Denmark and the Netherlands. In the United States, where it was released as Robyn's first single since "Do You Really Want Me (Show Respect)" (1998), it peaked at number twenty-eight on Billboards Hot Singles Sales chart.

Background and composition
In mid-2006 Kleerup played drums for Klas Åhlund alternative rock band Teddybears (whose song "Cobrastyle" Robyn covered). Kleerup had a severe nosebleed when he met Robyn through Klas after a gig in Stockholm early one morning following a massive street brawl downtown between Kleerup, Klas and paparazzi that had insulted Robyn, landing Klas a stint in jail.

"With Every Heartbeat" was composed in Kleerup's living room, where Robyn came up with the song's melody, inspired by Giorgio Moroder, "but mostly by the ZZ Top song 'Legs'". The song runs for four minutes and thirteen seconds in its entire form. It is composed in the key of D major, and is set in common time. It has an unconventional pop song structure and no distinct chorus. The string parts were originally arranged by Carl Bagge using Sibelius.

A physical single was released in the UK on 6 August 2007. It was named as both Jo Whiley's and Scott Mills's "Record of the Week" and was A-Listed on BBC's Radio 1. Robyn performed the song live on Radio 1 during the Jo Whiley Show on 8 August 2007. It also received strong support by Popjustice, who later ranked the single as the best of 2007.

The song was released in the United States in January 2008. A remix version is also featured in the soundtrack of How to Lose Friends and Alienate People. It was also featured in the 2007 movie Boy A and on the video game Grand Theft Auto V.

Critical reception
Digital Spy's Alex Fletcher gave the song four stars (out of five) and wrote "'With Every Heartbeat' is reminiscent of 90s dance tracks by the likes of Robert Miles. [...] The laid back, coffee-table friendly styling of the track calls to mind Moon Safari era Air, particularly their forgotten classic 'Kelly Watch the Stars'. While the lyrics may be devoid of any emotional clout, they tumble along pleasantly enough while the bleeps and glitches provided by Kleerup nurture your ears."

Steve Perkins of BBC Chart Blog praised the song for its lack of a chorus, writing "when you peel this song apart, it's actually very cyclical regardless: odd lines are repeated, but carefully chosen as if to reinforce the point that a new line just made. [...] There's a trembling quality to Robyn's voice in this song – as though she could fall apart at any moment but is keeping herself together by sheer force of will – which adds enormously to the fighting spirit of a song that is pessimistic without being bleak." Online music magazine Pitchfork placed the song at number 46 on their Top 500 Tracks of the Decade list. In October 2011, NME placed it at number 30 on its list "150 Best Tracks of the Past 15 Years".

Chart performance
"With Every Heartbeat" was Robyn's biggest hit in the United Kingdom, where it became the first number one, second top ten, and fourth top forty hit of her career. The song charted inside the top five on downloads alone the week before the song's physical release. As of 2020, the song has sold 491,000 in the UK in combined sales of purchased and streaming equivalent sales as stated by the Official Charts Company with 13.2 million UK plays.

Music video
Two videos were filmed for the song. Kleerup's version shows assorted scenes of life in New York City, while Robyn's version shows the singer walking among colourful building blocks and board game pawns. Robyn wears her trademark neckscarf and tights, which change colour as the song progresses. The stop motion animation moves in sync with the music. The song pans out halfway through the video to reveal that Robyn is miniature and in fact on a desk in Kleerup's studio. On display in Kleerup's studio is a vinyl copy of Barbra Streisand's album Guilty. The video finishes with the blocks featured in the video tumbling down while Robyn runs away from them, one successfully crushes her. This version of the video is a tribute to the animation of the highly respected late German artist Oskar Fischinger specifically his work entitled Komposition in Blau.

Track listing

Sweden
 CD single
 "With Every Heartbeat" (album version) – 4:06
 "With Every Heartbeat" (Meatboys Remix) – 4:24
 "With Every Heartbeat" (Punks Jump Up Remix) – 5:58
 "With Every Heartbeat" (Rory Phillips Remix) – 6:07

United Kingdom
7-inch single
A1. "With Every Heartbeat"
B1. "Konichiwa Bitches"

 12-inch single
A1. "With Every Heartbeat" (album version) – 4:10
A2. "With Every Heartbeat" (Tong & Spoon Wonderland Remix) – 7:15
B1. "With Every Heartbeat" (Punks Jump Up Remix) – 5:19
B2. "With Every Heartbeat" (Steve Angello Dub) – 7:12

 CD promo
 "With Every Heartbeat" (acoustic version) – 3:34

 CD single
 "With Every Heartbeat" (radio edit) – 3:17
 "With Every Heartbeat" (Tong & Spoon Wonderland Remix) – 7:17
 "With Every Heartbeat" (Punks Jump Up Remix) – 5:23
 "With Every Heartbeat" (album version) – 4:12
 "Konichiwa Bitches" (video) – 3:06

United States
 12-inch promo
A1. "With Every Heartbeat" (Tong & Spoon Wonderland Remix) – 7:15
A2. "With Every Heartbeat" (Corenell Remix) – 6:33
B1. "With Every Heartbeat" (VooDoo & Serano Remix) – 6:12
B2. "With Every Heartbeat" (Punks Jump Up Remix) – 5:21
B3. "With Every Heartbeat" (album version) – 4:13

 Digital download
 "With Every Heartbeat" (album version) – 4:15
 "With Every Heartbeat" (Tong & Spoon Wonderland Remix) – 7:14

 Digital download - Joakim Remix
 "With Every Hearbeat" (Joakim Remix) – 6:46

Germany
 12-inch single (Part 1)
A1. "With Every Heartbeat" (Steve Angello Dub)
A2. "With Every Heartbeat" (Hugg & Pepp Remix)
B1. "With Every Heartbeat" (Punks Jump Up Remix)
B2. "With Every Heartbeat" (Kleerup Remix)

 12-inch single (Part 2)
A1. "With Every Heartbeat" (Corenell Remix)
B1. "With Every Heartbeat" (VooDoo & Serano Remix)

 CD single
 "With Every Heartbeat" (radio edit) – 3:20
 "With Every Heartbeat" (album version) – 4:15
 "With Every Heartbeat" (acoustic version) – 3:37
 "With Every Heartbeat" (Punks Jump Up Remix) – 5:25
 "With Every Heartbeat" (VooDoo & Serano Edit) – 6:15
 "With Every Heartbeat" (Kleerup Remix) – 7:07
 "With Every Heartbeat" (video) – 4:03

Belgium
 CD remix maxi-single
 "With Every Heartbeat" (album version) – 4:13
 "With Every Heartbeat" (VooDoo & Serano Remix) – 6:14
 "With Every Heartbeat" (Corenell Remix) – 6:35
 "With Every Heartbeat" (Kenson Remix) – 7:15
 "With Every Heartbeat" (Tong & Spoon Wonderland Remix) – 7:17
 "With Every Heartbeat" (Hugg & Pepp Remix) – 7:04
 "With Every Heartbeat" (Punks Jump Up Remix) – 5:21
 "With Every Heartbeat" (Steve Angello Dub) – 7:13
 "With Every Heartbeat" (Kleerup Remix) – 6:49

Personnel
Personnel adapted from CD single liner notes.
Music – Robyn, Andreas Kleerup
Lyrics – Robyn
Producer – Kleerup
Violin – Johanna Tafvelin, Karin Liljenberg
Viola – Ida Nyman
Cello – Cecilia Linné
Mixing – Eric Wikstroon, Andreas Kleerup
Mastering – Björn Engelmann

Charts

Weekly charts

Year-end charts

Certifications and sales

Release history

See also
 List of UK Singles Chart number ones of the 2000s

References

2000s ballads
2006 songs
2007 singles
Electropop ballads
Eurodisco songs
Number-one singles in Scotland
Robyn songs
Song recordings produced by Xenomania
Songs written by Kleerup
Songs written by Robyn
UK Singles Chart number-one singles